Charles Lee Tilden (July 17, 1857 – November 12, 1950) was an attorney and businessman in the San Francisco Bay Area who served on the first Board of Directors of the East Bay Regional Park District.  One of the first three parks in the District was named for him: Tilden Regional Park.

Tilden was born in the Sierra foothills town of Chile Gulch, Calaveras County on July 17, 1857 to Harmon J. Tilden and Mary Jane Lee.  His father was a judge.  The Tildens moved to San Francisco in 1865.

Tilden graduated from Lowell High School in 1874 and from the University of California, Berkeley in 1878.  He received his law degree from Hastings College of Law in 1881.  While attending the University of California, he joined a campus unit which was eventually incorporated into the California National Guard.  His affiliation with the National Guard continued through the Spanish–American War, in which he participated.  He left the Guard with the rank of major and was often addressed as "Major Tilden" for the remainder of his life.

Tilden married Lilly Mitchell (nee Von Schmidt; October 12, 1859 – November 8, 1946) on June 9, 1892.  The Tildens resided in Alameda.  Tilden Way at the southeast end of Alameda is named for him.

The Tildens' son, Charles Lee Tilden, Jr. (June 4, 1894 – September 21, 1968) was a member of the United States Olympic rugby team in 1920 at Antwerp and 1924 at Paris, winning the gold medal in both Olympiads.  Mrs. Tilden had two daughters from her previous marriage.

In the 1930s, Tilden led the effort to create a system of regional parks in the East Bay, and served as the first President of the East Bay Regional Park District Board of Directors.  He was also a Mills College Trustee.  Tilden died at age 93 on November 12, 1950 and was buried at the Mountain View Cemetery in Oakland.

References
 Berkeley Daily Gazette, November 13, 1950, p. 1

External links
 Tilden genealogy
 Lowell alumni
 Picture of Tilden's Lumber Business in Richmond

1857 births
1950 deaths
People from the San Francisco Bay Area
Burials at Mountain View Cemetery (Oakland, California)
East Bay Regional Park District
University of California, Berkeley alumni
University of California, Hastings College of the Law alumni
Tilden Regional Park
Lowell High School (San Francisco) alumni